James David Cain Jr. (born November 30, 1964) is a United States district judge of the United States District Court for the Western District of Louisiana.

Education 

Cain earned his Bachelor of Arts from McNeese State University (where he was roommates with Joe Dumars) and his Juris Doctor, cum laude, from the Southern University Law Center in Baton Rouge. Prior to entering law school, he served for three years as a congressional aide to Representative Jimmy Hayes, who served Louisiana's 7th congressional district from 1987 to 1997.

Legal career 

Upon graduation from law school, Cain clerked for Judge Henry L. Yelverton of the Louisiana Third Circuit Court of Appeal.

Before starting his own firm, he practiced for twelve years at Lundy & Davis. He is a founding member and former partner of the Lake Charles-based firm Loftin, Cain & LeBlanc, LLC, where his practice focused on civil litigation in state and federal courts.

Federal judicial service 

On August 27, 2018, President Donald Trump announced his intent to nominate Cain to serve as a United States district judge for the United States District Court for the Western District of Louisiana. On August 28, 2018, his nomination was sent to the Senate. President Trump nominated Cain to the vacated by Judge Patricia Head Minaldi, who assumed senior status on July 31, 2017. On November 13, 2018, a hearing on his nomination was held before the Senate Judiciary Committee.

On January 3, 2019, his nomination was returned to the President under Rule XXXI, Paragraph 6 of the United States Senate. On January 23, 2019, President Trump announced his intent to renominate Cain for a federal judgeship. His nomination was sent to the Senate later that day. On February 7, 2019, his nomination was reported out of committee by a 20–2 vote. On June 18, 2019, the Senate invoked cloture on his nomination by a 76–20 vote. On June 19, 2019, his nomination was confirmed by a 77–21 vote. He received his judicial commission on June 25, 2019.

References

External links 

1964 births
Living people
20th-century American lawyers
21st-century American judges
21st-century American lawyers
Federalist Society members
Judges of the United States District Court for the Western District of Louisiana
Louisiana lawyers
McNeese State University alumni
People from DeRidder, Louisiana
People from Lake Charles, Louisiana
Southern University Law Center alumni
United States district court judges appointed by Donald Trump